Andhadhi is a 2015 Indian Tamil-language crime-thriller starring  Arjun Vijayaraghavan and Anjena Kirti. Karthik Nagarajan, Sahithya Jagannathan, Bhargav Chakravarthy, and Poovilangu Mohan play crucial supporting roles. The film marks the directorial debut of Ramesh Venkataraman.

Plot 
A minister, Vallarasu, gets a payment of millions of rupees for permitting a solar power project. This event causes both a kidnapping and a murder, and two young police officers (Guna and Deva), take control of the problem.

Cast 
Source

 Arjun Vijayaraghavan as K. Guna Sekhar
 Anjena Kirti as Anjana
 Karthik Nagarajan as Deva
 Sahithya Jagannathan as Aruna
 Bhargav Chakravarthy as Rajesh
 Poovilangu Mohan as Vallarasu
 Nizhalgal Ravi as Nyanasekhar
 Mlv Shankar as Srinivasan
 Chetan as Durairaj
 Shiva Pandian as Veera
 Sriram Thyagarajan as Muthupandian
 Mohan Raman

Production 
Feminina Miss India 2014 Sahithya Jagannathan was signed to play the role of a police officer in the film.

Soundtrack 
The music was composed by Shamanth Nag. Lyrics were written by Viveka, Ravi, and Gomez.

"Mazhai Azhaga" – Ramya NSK
"Kuzhal Oodhi" – Niranjana, Poornima
"Artecha" (Theme) – Shamanth 
"Anal Meleh" – Vijay Prakash
"Andhadhi" – Shamanath, Gomez
"Andhadhi" (Theme) 
"Vaanavillileh" – Sonu Kakkar, Yashwanth Nag

Release 
The Hindu gave the film an unfavourable review and wrote that "What we get is Yuddham Sei as imagined by a maker of mega-serials". The Times of India gave the film a rating of one-and-half out five stars and stated that "There is sign of spark here, but one cannot expect audiences to put up with such amateurishness just because it’s a low-budget film".

References

External links 

2015 films
2010s Tamil-language films
Indian crime thriller films
2015 crime thriller films